

First classification 
In 2005, the Department of Railroad Stations of the Polish State Railways divided the most important stations of the nation into four categories. These categories were named from A to D, based on number of passengers, visiting the stations annually.
 Category A (16 stations) - more than 2 million passengers annually,
 Category B (22 stations) - between 1 and 2 million passengers annually,
 Category C (35 stations) - between 300,000 - 1 million passengers annually,
 Category D (4 stations) - fewer than 300,000 passengers annually.

Current classification system since 2015 
In 2015, PKP SA introduced a new classification system of railway stations, based upon the importance of the station in general. Basic criteria are the kind of services served by the station, and number of commercial service points located within them.

Overall, all stations are assigned to one of the categories:
 Premium station — stations served by international, intercity and interregional routes, which are an important interchange stations for entire state. Commercial services for passengers are provided.
 Voivodeship station — stations served by international, intercity and interregional routes, offering standard commercial services.
 Agglomeration station — stations serving domestic routes located up to 50 km away from city centre, with none or minimal commercial services.
 Regional station — stations located in towns, mainly serving local and regional routes, they are an important interchange for boroughs.
 Local station — stations used by commuters arriving to larger cities.
 Tourist station — stations with little traffic rate, being mostly used during holiday seasons.

References